American screenwriter, director and producer Joss Whedon has generated numerous films and television series over the course of his career, many of which have influenced popular culture and acquired "cult status".

Film

Uncredited works

Television

Online media

References

External links

Joss Whedon at Rotten Tomatoes

Whedon, Joss